Manuel Höferlin (born 6 February 1973) is a German politician of the Free Democratic Party (FDP) who has served as a member of the Bundestag from the state of Rhineland-Palatinate from 2009 till 2013 and since 2017.

Early life and career 
Höferlin was born in Paris and moved to Harxheim in Rheinhessen at the age of five. In 1992, he graduated from the Gutenberg-Gymnasium in Mainz and subsequently studied law at the University of Mainz. While still a student, he went into business for himself, founded an IT consulting company in 1997 and took a stake in a management consultancy, where he was managing director until early 2009.

Political career 
In 2005 Höferlin joined the FDP. From 2009 to 2013 he was a member of the Bundestag for the first time, representing the Worms district. During that time, he served on the Committee on Internal Affairs and the Committee on Legal Affairs. Due to the failure of his party to reach the five percent hurdle in the 2013 federal elections, he resigned from the Bundestag. 

Höferlin became a member of the Bundestag again in the 2017 German federal election. In parliament, he serves on the Committee on Internal Affairs and the Committee on the Digital Agenda, which he chaired from 2019 to 2021. He has also been his parliamentary group’s spokesman for digital policy (2018–2021) and internal affairs (since 2021).

In the negotiations to form a so-called traffic light coalition of the Social Democratic Party (SPD), the Green Party and the FDP following the 2021 German elections, Höferlin was part of his party's delegation in the working group on digital innovation and infrastructure, co-chaired by Jens Zimmermann, Malte Spitz and Andreas Pinkwart.

Other activities 
 Foundation for Data Protection, Member of the Advisory Board (since 2022)

References

External links 

  
 Bundestag biography 
 

1973 births
Living people
Members of the Bundestag for Rhineland-Palatinate
Members of the Bundestag 2021–2025
Members of the Bundestag 2017–2021
Members of the Bundestag 2009–2013
Members of the Bundestag for the Free Democratic Party (Germany)